The Gundry Sanitarium, also known variously as the Relay Sanitarium, Lewis Gundry Sanitarium, Gundry Hospital, and Conrad Sanitarium, was a medical institution established in 1900 in Southwest Baltimore City, Maryland. The building, originally named "Athol," was constructed in 1880 by Charles J. Baker and was purchased in 1900 by Dr Alfred Gundry as a private sanitarium for the "care of nervous disorders of women that required treatment and rest away from home." It continued in existence as a private sanitarium until 1997. It was purchased by the city in 2006 for historic preservation, but it burned down on September 27, 2021, prior to any improvements.

References 

Psychiatric hospitals in Maryland
Defunct hospitals in Maryland
Hospitals in Baltimore
Hospitals in Baltimore County, Maryland
1900 establishments in Maryland
Hospitals established in 1900
Hospitals disestablished in 2000
2000 disestablishments in Maryland